The Guam kingfisher (Todiramphus cinnamominus) is a species of kingfisher from the United States Territory of Guam. It is restricted to a captive breeding program following its extinction in the wild due primarily to predation by the introduced brown tree snake.

Taxonomy and description
In the indigenous Chamorro language, it is referred to as sihek.

The mysterious extinct Ryūkyū kingfisher, known from a single specimen, is sometimes placed as a subspecies (T. c. miyakoensis; Fry et al. 1992), but was declared invalid by the International Ornithological Congress in 2022, rendering the species monotypic.  Among-island differences in morphological, behavioral, and ecological characteristics have been determined sufficient that Micronesian kingfisher populations, of which the Guam kingfisher was considered a subspecies, should be split into separate species.

This is a brilliantly colored, medium-sized kingfisher, 20–24 cm in length. They have iridescent blue backs and rusty-cinnamon heads. Adult male Guam kingfishers have cinnamon underparts while females and juveniles are white below. They have large laterally-flattened bills and dark legs.  The calls of Micronesian kingfishers are generally raspy chattering.

Behavior
Guam kingfishers were terrestrial forest generalists that tended to be somewhat secretive.  The birds nested in cavities excavated from soft-wooded trees and arboreal termitaria, on Guam. Micronesian kingfishers defended permanent territories as breeding pairs and family groups.  Both sexes care for young, and some offspring remain with parents for extended periods. Research suggests that thermal environment has the potential to influence reproduction.

Conservation status
The Guam kingfisher population was extirpated from its native habitat after the introduction of brown tree snakes. It was last seen in the wild in 1988, and the birds are now U.S. listed as endangered.  The Guam kingfisher persists as a captive population of fewer than two hundred individuals (as of 2017) in US mainland and Guam breeding facilities.  However, there are plans to reintroduce the Guam birds to Palmyra Atoll by 2023, and potentially also back to their native range on Guam if protected areas can be established and the threat of the brown tree snakes is eliminated or better controlled.  Unfortunately, however, three decades of research and management has yielded little hope for safe habitats on Guam.

References

Pratt, H.D., P.L. Bruner, and D.G. Berrett. 1987. The Birds of Hawaii and the Tropical Pacific. Princeton University Press.  Princeton, NJ.

U.S. Fish and Wildlife Service, 2004. Draft Revised Recovery Plan for the Sihek or Guam Micronesian Kingfisher (Halcyon cinnamomina cinnamomina).
U.S. Fish and Wildlife Service, 1984. Endangered and threatened wildlife and plants: determination of endangered status for seven birds and two bats on Guam and the Northern Mariana Islands. Federal Register 50 CFR Part 17 49(167), 33881–33885.
U.S. Fish and Wildlife Service, 2004. Draft Revised Recovery Plan for the Sihek or Guam Micronesian Kingfisher (Halcyon cinnamomina cinnamomina). U.S. Fish and Wildlife Service, Portland, OR.

External links

 BirdLife Species Factsheet.
Micronesian kingfisher Naturalis The Netherlands
 Philadelphia Zoo - Description of Guam Micronesian kingfisher Conservation efforts
 United States Fish and Wildlife Service  - Threatened and Endangered Animals in the Pacific Islands.
 US Geological Survey - USGS Micronesian Avifauna Conservation Projects
 US Geological Survey - The Brown Treesnake on Guam.

Guam kingfisher
Birds of Guam
Guam kingfisher
ESA endangered species